Venice Township is one of the fifteen townships of Seneca County, Ohio, United States.  The 2010 census found 1,758 people in the township, 859 of whom lived in the unincorporated portions of the township.

Geography
Located in the southeastern corner of the county, it borders the following townships:
Reed Township - north
Norwich Township, Huron County - northeast
Richmond Township, Huron County - east
Cranberry Township, Crawford County - southeast
Chatfield Township, Crawford County - southwest
Bloom Township - west
Scipio Township - northwest corner

The village of Attica is located in northern Venice Township, and the unincorporated community of Caroline is located in the township's center.

Name and history
It is the only Venice Township statewide.

Venice Township was organized in 1829.

Government
The township is governed by a three-member board of trustees, who are elected in November of odd-numbered years to a four-year term beginning on the following January 1. Two are elected in the year after the presidential election and one is elected in the year before it. There is also an elected township fiscal officer, who serves a four-year term beginning on April 1 of the year after the election, which is held in November of the year before the presidential election. Vacancies in the fiscal officership or on the board of trustees are filled by the remaining trustees.

References

External links
County website

Townships in Seneca County, Ohio
Townships in Ohio